Divino de São Lourenço is a municipality located in the Brazilian state of Espírito Santo. Its population was 4,649 (2015) and its area is 174 km2.

References

Municipalities in Espírito Santo